The women's 3000 metres steeplechase competition of the athletics events at the 2019 Pan American Games took place the 10 August at the 2019 Pan American Games Athletics Stadium. The defending Pan American Games champion is Ashley Higginson from United States.

Summary
From the start of the race, Tatiane Raquel da Silva and Geneviève Lalonde went to the front, da Silva on the rail and Lalonde on her outside shoulder.  They held that formation for four laps before da Silva slipped back, leaving Lalonde in control on the rail.  The outer position was filled by Marisa Howard with Belén Casetta also getting ahead of da Silva.  Regan Yee tagged on the end of a 5 woman break from the rest of the field.  Over the next lap, Lalonde broke away from Howard and Casetta was the only one to tag along.  Over the final 2 laps, Lalonde put the hammer down and extended her lead to a 2 and a half second victory.  Over the final lap, Casetta tried to close down the gap to Howard, but Howard was monitoring the situation.  When Casetta tried to sprint coming off the water jump, Howard responded to hold on to silver.

Records
Prior to this competition, the existing world and Pan American Games records were as follows:

Schedule

Results
All times shown are in seconds.

Final
The results were as follows

References

Athletics at the 2019 Pan American Games
2015